Francois van Rensburg (born Windhoek, 23 February 1974) is a Namibian former rugby union footballer. He played as a centre and as a fly-half. His profession was a farmer.

He had 15 caps for Namibia, from 1995 to 2001, scoring 2 tries, 10 points in aggregate. He played three games at the 1999 Rugby World Cup finals, where his country entered for the first time.

External links
Profile of Francois van Rensburg
Francois van Rensburg International Statistics

1974 births
Living people
Namibia international rugby union players
Namibian Afrikaner people
Namibian farmers
Namibian people of Dutch descent
Namibian rugby union players
Rugby union centres
Rugby union fly-halves
Rugby union players from Windhoek
White Namibian people